The 1996 Ivy League Baseball Championship Series took place at Bill Clarke Field in Princeton, New Jersey on May 11, 1996.  The series matched the regular season champions of each of the league's two divisions.  , the winner of the series, claimed their first title and the Ivy League's automatic berth in the 1996 NCAA Division I baseball tournament.   The Tigers first defeated Penn, 5–4, on May 9 to win the Gehrig Division.  It was Princeton's first appearance in the Championship Series.

Harvard also made their first appearance in the Championship Series.  It was the first time in the four year old event that Yale did not participate.

Results

References

Ivy League Baseball Championship Series
Tournament
Ivy League Baseball Championship Series